Nathan Watt (April 6, 1889 – May 26, 1968) was an American film director. He directed 30 films between 1916 and 1961.

Filmography

 The Torch Bearer (1916) (actor)
 Persistent Percival (1916, short)
 Cooking His Goose (1916, short) 
 The Man Who Would Not Die (1916)
 The Galloping Devil (1920)
 What Women Love (as Nate C. Watt) (1920)
 Three Good Pals (1921, short) 
 The Raiders (1921)
 The Hunger of the Blood (1921)
 Bad Breaks (1926, short)
 Pound Foolish (1926, short)
 All Quiet on the Western Front (1930; assistant director)
 High Spirits (1927, short)
 Dear Season (1927, short)
 Hot Cookies (1927, short)
 Air Maniacs (1933, short)
 Hopalong Cassidy Returns (1936)
 Trail Dust (1936)
 Mariners of the Sky/Navy Born (1936)
 Carnival Queen (1937)
 Rustlers' Valley (1937)
 North of the Rio Grande (1937)
 Hills of Old Wyoming (1937)
 Borderland (1937)
 Three Men in a Tub (1938, short)
 The Awful Tooth (1938, short)
 Law of the Pampas (1939)
 Oklahoma Renegades (1940)
 Frontier Vengeance (1940)
 Cheyenne Cowboy (1949, short)
 Six-Gun Music (1949, short)
 Fiend of Dope Island (1961)

References

External links

1889 births
1968 deaths
People from Denver
Film directors from Colorado